This is a list of years in United Arab Emirates.

20th century

21st century

See also
 Timeline of Abu Dhabi
 Timeline of Dubai

Further reading

External links
 

 
History of the United Arab Emirates
United Arab Emirates history-related lists
United Arab Emirates